Michael James Totten (born September 16, 1970) is an American journalist and author  who has reported from the Middle East, Africa, the Balkans, Cuba, Vietnam, and the Caucasus. His work appears in various publications, websites, and on his blog. His first book, The Road to Fatima Gate, was published in 2011 and was awarded the Washington Institute Silver Book Prize. In his blog posts, he also describes himself as an "independent journalist", while regularly exposing his thoughts in articles which often focus on Middle Eastern conflicts.

Early life and education

Totten is of English descent and was born in Salem, Oregon on September 16, 1970. His mother is Gena Layman Pegg and his father John Totten is a Republican and a military veteran. Totten's grandfather was a World War II veteran. Totten attended McKinley Elementary School in Salem, Oregon.

Totten studied English literature at the University of Oregon in the early 1990s, after attending South Salem High School in the 1980s. He has said that he did not like his time living in Salem and that he was glad to leave.

Career
In the 1990s, Totten wrote an opinion column for The Daily Iowan.

Since, Totten's work has appeared in The Wall Street Journal, The New York Times, City Journal,
the New York Daily News,
The Jerusalem Post, the Daily Star of Lebanon, Reason magazine, Commentary,
LA Weekly, Front Page, Tech Central Station, and the Australian edition of Newsweek.

In July 2007, Totten traveled to Baghdad to embed with several U.S. Army units before transitioning to Anbar province and embedding with U.S. Marines. In late 2007 he embedded with U.S. Marines in Fallujah, and he embedded again with the U.S. Army in Baghdad in late 2008.

Totten won the 2007 Weblog Award for Best Middle East or Africa Blog, he won it again in 2008, and was named Blogger of the Year in 2006 by The Week magazine for his dispatches from the Middle East. He was in Georgia during the 2008 South Ossetia war.

His most recent book is Tower of the Sun: Stories from the Middle East and North Africa.

Ideology
In the past Totten has described himself as a "weird combination of liberal, libertarian, and neocon" and later he described himself as politically centrist. He believed that the critics of the war in Iraq who noted the lack of progress from 2004 to 2006 were correct while the Bush administration was wrong. He supported the 2007 'surge' strategy.

On June 23, 2010, Totten lauded Barack Obama's decision to accept General Stanley McChrystal's resignation, and Totten labeled it "one of the best decisions the president has made since he took office."

Funding
Totten describes himself as an "independent journalist." Most of his trips—to Iraq, Lebanon, Turkey, Israel, Egypt, Libya, Bosnia, Kosovo, Georgia, and several other places—are paid for out of his own pocket, although he has also accepted funding from the government of Azerbaijan, the American Jewish Committee and the Lebanese pro-western March 14 alliance for trips to Azerbaijan, Israel, and Lebanon, respectively.

Personal life
In the early 2000s, Totten married Shelly Lynn Stephenson in Oregon's Multnomah County. He describes his wife as "conventionally" liberal. They are both registered Democrats and atheists, although Totten did not vote for Barack Obama and is a former Christian. They lived together in the Sunnyside neighborhood of Portland, Oregon until they moved in late 2020 or early 2021.

Totten was briefly a Libertarian during the 1990s but became a Democrat afterwards, though he has previously said that he was never fully content with being a Democrat and has considered returning to the Libertarians.

Books
Totten's first book, The Road to Fatima Gate: The Beirut Spring, the Rise of Hezbollah, and the Iranian War Against Israel (Encounter Books, April 2011), reports his experiences in the Middle East, primarily those in Lebanon.

Other books include:
 Tower of the Sun: Stories From the Middle East and North Africa  (2014)
 Where the West Ends (2012)
 Resurrection: A Zombie Novel (2014)
 Taken – A Novel (2013)
 In the Wake of the Surge (2011)
 On the Hunt in Baghdad (2011)
 In the Land of the Brother Leader (2011)
 Raid Night  (2011)

References

Further reading
 Hope for Iraq's Meanest City City Journal, Spring 2008
 Interview at National Review Online, February 2006
 Review of The Road to Fatima Gate by Sol Stern, City Journal, Spring 2011
 Uncommon Knowledge: Michael Totten – The Road to Fatima Gate  Peter Robinson interviews Totten, May 2011
 What skews news reportage of Israel & Arab issues?, August 2014

External links

 
 
 
Facebook fan page
 
 

1970 births
American male journalists
American people of English descent
American political blogs
American reporters and correspondents
American former Christians
American atheists
Journalists from Oregon
Living people
Oregon Democrats
Writers from Portland, Oregon
Writers from Salem, Oregon
Writers on the Middle East